Dyserth Castle is a castle site in Denbighshire in the country of Wales. It is a scheduled monument protected ancient borough on a ridge north of the village of Dyserth. It was the last castle of the British fortified defences on the Clwydian hill range in the Middle Ages. The nearby village of Dyserth got its name from the castle.

History 
Dyserth Castle has been known also as Castell Diserth, Castle de Rupe, Castle of the Rock, Caerfaelan, Carregfaelan, Castell-y-Garrec, Dincolyn, Castell y Ffailon, and Castell Cerri. It is on a high rock summit of carboniferous limestone less than a mile from its namesake village. Excavation of the site shows four periods of fortified occupation – Neolithic, Bronze Age, Romano-British and Middle ages. There are local stories of a "Castell Dincolyn" at this hill of pre-Norman times.

The Welsh prince Llywelyn the Great died in 1240, and after his death the English extended their authority into Wales as far north as the River Conwy. This was from the result of three military campaigns to expand the royal lands of the County of Chester. To confirm their control of the territory the English then began the building of new castles and rebuilding of certain older castles including Rhuddlan Castle and Deganwy Castle.

Dyserth Castle was one of those castles, and was intended to replace the original Old Rhuddlan castle at Twthill and to supplement Deganwy Castle. Dyserth Castle has an unclear recorded history for its beginning foundations. A castle was thought to have been begun in 1238 somewhere close to the present site. This first castle was unsuitable, and either taken down completely or reinforced in 1241 by Henry III to become an English fortified castle.

Sir Robert Pounderling, an English knight, was constable of the castle from 1241 to 1263. There is a story that he had one of his eyes poked out by a Welshman during a tournament at the castle. Pounderling was challenged again in another tournament by the Welshman, but declined – he didn't want the other eye poked out!

Einion, son of Rhirid Flaidd, was killed at the siege of Dyserth Castle in 1263. A cross called "Bryn Einion" was erected on the spot of his death. The shaft, at one time a part of the stile in the Dyserth churchyard, bears an inscription of strange lines and letters. According to a manuscript by Dafydd Ddu o Hiraddug the encrypted message reads,  HOC SI PETATUR LAPSIS ISTE CAUSA NOTATUR | EINION OXI RIRID VLAIDD FILIUS HOC MEMORATUR. A translation has been given as,  THAT NEAR HERE THE CAUSE HIS FALL, IF THEY ASK OF SECRET WRITING | REMEMBER EINION, THIS IS THE SON OF RIRID VLAIDD.

Description 
Dyserth Castle was situated in a naturally defensible strategic location on a mountain ridge at the north end of the Clwydian hills, west of the Conwy River. The small internal courtyard for the castle was entered by way of a twin-towered gatehouse. The castle had a concentric outer curtain wall and according to historian Sean Mason that would be the first constructed in Wales' castles. Dyserth Castle was the last of the British fortified defence castles on the Clwydian hill range in the Middle Ages.

Demise 

Dyserth Castle was first attacked by the Welsh around 1245. It was attacked a number of times over nearly two decades and was seized and occupied at different periods by the English and Welsh. In 1263, it was totally destroyed by the Welsh prince Llywelyn ap Gruffudd after several weeks of a blockade and siege. During World War I, the ridge served as a quarry and much of the former castle ruins were removed.

References

Sources

External links 
Croes Einion secret writing picture

Castles in Denbighshire
Castle ruins in Wales
Scheduled monuments in Denbighshire